Tunggan Mangudadatu Piang (died July 8, 2013) was a Filipino politician. He was ARMM MLA for Maguindanao.

Death
Piang died of a heart attack on July 8, 2013.

References

2013 deaths
Independent politicians in the Philippines
Year of birth missing
People from Maguindanao
Filipino Muslims